Charbagh is a town in Khyber-Pakhtunkhwa province of Pakistan. It is part of Mansehra District and is located at 34°30'5N 73°1'20E with an altitude of 1154 metres (3789 feet).

References

Populated places in Mansehra District